South Homestead Township is a township in Barton County, Kansas, United States.  As of the 2010 census, its population was 322.

Geography
The incorporated city of Hoisington sits on the township's northern border with North Homestead Township. According to the USGS, it contains two cemeteries: Hillcrest Memorial Park and Saint John.

The stream of Deception Creek runs through this township.

References
 USGS Geographic Names Information System (GNIS)

External links
 City-Data.com

Townships in Barton County, Kansas
Townships in Kansas